The historic county of Derbyshire, located in the 21st century region of East Midlands, was represented in Parliament from the 13th century. This article provides a list of constituencies constituting the Parliamentary representation from Derbyshire.

In 1889 Derbyshire became an administrative county and in 1974 much the same area became a shire county. Derby became a unitary authority in 1997, but it remains part of the ceremonial county of Derbyshire.

The first part of this article covers the constituencies wholly or predominantly within the area of the historic county of Derbyshire, both before and after the administrative changes of 1889 and 1974. The second part refers to constituencies mostly in another historic county, which included some territory from the historic county of Derbyshire (if any). The summaries section only refers to the constituencies included in the first section of the constituency list.

List of constituencies
Article names are followed by (UK Parliament constituency). The constituencies which existed in 1707 were those previously represented in the Parliament of England.

Key to abbreviations:
 (Type) BC Borough constituency, CC County constituency.
 (Administrative County in Notes) D historic/administrative/shire/ceremonial county of Derbyshire.

Constituencies wholly or predominantly in the historic county

Constituencies mostly in another historic county

Periods constituencies represented

Summaries

Summary of Constituencies by Type and Period

Summary of Members of Parliament by Type and Period

See also
 Wikipedia:Index of article on UK Parliament constituencies in England
 Wikipedia:Index of articles on UK Parliament constituencies in England N-Z
 Parliamentary representation by historic counties
 First Protectorate Parliament
 Unreformed House of Commons

References

"History of Parliament". Retrieved 2013-10-28

Derbyshire, Historic county of
Politics of Derbyshire